Utku Cihan Yalçınkaya (born 1998), better known by his stage name Uzi, is a Turkish rapper and songwriter. He rose with his hit songs "Krvn" and "Umrumda Değil". His debut album Kan was released in 2021. In July 2021, Uzi became the first Turkish artist to enter the Billboard Global Excl. U.S. chart with his single "Krvn". His single "ARASAN DA" came out in "EL CHAVO" album.

Discography

Albums and EPs 

 EL CHAVO (2022)

Kan (2021)
Favela (2019)
Output Nr.1 (ft. Murda) (2019)

Singles and duets 
 Para (ft. Montiego) (2022)
 RS (ft. Bartofso & Murda) (2022)
 Arasan da (2022)
 LE CANE (RMX) (ft. Muti, Murda, Summer Cem, Critical & Heijan) (2022)
 Yengen Kızar (Nickobella Remix) (ft. Tuhan) (2022)
 Paparazzi (2021)
 Cindy (2021)
 KHRBR (ft. Ati242 & Batuflex & Lvbel C5 & Motive & Murda) (2021)
 ACAYİP (ft. Ali471) (2021)
 LE CANE (ft. Critical & Heijan & Muti) (2021)
 HARAM HELAL (ft. Capo) (2021)
 Yengen Kızar (ft. Tuhan) (2021)
 AMCAS RMX (ft. Batuflex & Lvbel C5 & Critical) (2021)
 Milyoner (ft. Critical) (2021)
 Mektup (ft. Motive & Aksan & Güneş & Modd) (2021)
 Turkish Nightmare (ft. Eko Fresh & Motive & Killa Hakan & Hayki) (2020)
 Dua (ft. Güneş) (2020)
 Makina (2020)
 Düzgün Kal (ft. Aksan) (2020)
 Paranoya (2020)
 Sizin Gibi Olmak (ft. Vio & Ati242) (2020)
 Düş Yakamdan (2020)
 Ateş Ediyo (ft. Tepki) (2020)
 Mis Gibi (ft. Motive) (2019)

References 

Turkish rappers
1998 births
Turkish people of Kurdish descent
Living people